GAPP may refer to:
 General Administration of Press and Publication
 Generally Accepted Privacy Principles, framework for accountants to help manage privacy concerns
 German American Partnership Program
 Geometric-Arithmetic Parallel Processor
 GapP, A complexity class of counting in computer science

See also
Gapp, a surname